Mart Laar (born 22 April 1960) is an Estonian politician and historian. He served as the Prime Minister of Estonia from 1992 to 1994 and from 1999 to 2002. Laar is credited with having helped bring about Estonia's rapid economic development during the 1990s. He is a member of the centre-right Isamaa party.

In April 2011, Mart Laar became Minister of Defence in the cabinet of Prime Minister Andrus Ansip and served until his resignation for reasons of health in May 2012.

In April 2013, Riigikogu appointed Laar as chairman of the supervisory board of the Bank of Estonia, his term beginning on 12 June 2013.

Career

Mart Laar was born in Viljandi. He studied history at the University of Tartu, graduating in 1983; he received his master's degree in philosophy and his doctorate in history in 2005. Laar taught history in Tallinn, and served as president of the Council of Historians of the Foundation of the Estonia Inheritance, the Society for the Preservation of Estonian History, and the Estonian Students' Society.  Laar has written many books on Estonian and Soviet history, among them War in the Woods: Estonia's Struggle for Survival, 1944–1956, a book about the Forest Brothers anti-Soviet resistance movement.

Laar's political career began when he became a member of the conservative Pro Patria Union party (which later merged with the more technocratic Res Publica Party in 2006). He was elected prime minister by the Riigikogu on 21 October 1992.

In barely two years, from 1992 to 1994, the radical reforming Estonian government of Mart Laar was the first in Europe to introduce the flat tax, privatized most national industry in transparent public tenders, abolished tariffs and subsidies, stabilized the 
economy and balanced the budget.

Due to several scandals, Laar was defeated in 1994 by no-confidence vote, when some members of the coalition withdrew their support.  Reasons for the vote were publicized details of arms deal with Israel and so called "rouble scandal" -  the sale of 2.3 billion Rbls, withdrawn from circulation during the Estonian monetary reform of 1992, to breakaway Chechen Republic of Ichkeria, carried out by Laar's associates at an Estonian private company, Maag, without consulting Parliament.

Five years later, in 1999, Laar returned to the post, with his main policy goals being to pull the economy out of a slump and lead the country toward the European Union. He remained in the post until he stepped down in 2002.

On 18 May 1999 while Prime Minister, Mart Laar with security advisor Jaan Tross, Võru County head Robert Lepikson and Government Office coordination director Eerik-Niiles Kross used a shotgun to shoot at a photo of Edgar Savisaar, leader of opposition party Keskerakond. Later he explained that during shooting he acted as a private person, not as the Prime Minister.
Mart Laar apologized for this event as Prime Minister and army officer.

Recognition
Laar has multiple Orders from Estonia and other countries.

The results of the radical reforms have been recognized by Cato Institute, which awarded Laar the Cato Institute's Milton Friedman Prize for Advancing Liberty in 2006.

The Acton Institute awarded Dr. Laar their Faith & Freedom Award on 24 October 2007.

Mart Laar is member of Honorary Board of the European Association of History Educators (EUROCLIO). He is also a member of the international advisory council of the Victims of Communism Memorial Foundation.

The House of Terror Museum in Hungary awarded Mart Laar the Petőfi Prize in 2011 for his contributions to investigating the crimes of communism.

Recent activities

Together with Václav Havel, Filip Dimitrov, Árpád Göncz, Petr Pithart, Vytautas Landsbergis, Patricio Aylwin and other transition leaders, he participates in the International Committee for Democracy in Cuba.

Laar is a member of the International Council of the New York-based Human Rights Foundation and a founding member of the Unitas Foundation.

In 2003, Laar received the Wharton Infosys Business Transformation Award brought about the development of electronic systems in Estonia to upgrade the country's infrastructure.

After the Rose Revolution in Georgia, Laar became advisor to the country's President Mikheil Saakashvili and in 2010 received Order of St. George.

In September 2006, Laar announced that he will come out of political retirement to run for the candidacy for Prime Minister of the new Union of Pro Patria and Res Publica party.

Mart Laar was Mont Pelerin Society member.

On 26 May 2007 he was elected a Chairman of the Union of Pro Patria and Res Publica.

On 18 February 2012 Mart Laar suffered from a stroke and stepped down as Defence Minister three months later. Until October 2012 Laar had still been staying out of the public eye, but was reportedly recovering.

In 2012, the Estonian National Audit Office declassified a 1995 audit about arms deal which caused newspaper Eesti Ekspress to publish a critical article about Laar.

Relationship with the media 
In 1994, the Estonian Newspaper Association declared Laar the Year's Press Friend. This was the first time this award was given; since that, it has been a yearly occurrence. In 2001, Laar was given the complementary award of Year's Press Enemy.

In January 2012, Laar became a meme, when in the heat of the ACTA discussion in Estonia, he explained the disappearance of ACTA-related posts from his Facebook page with "lack of space" in Facebook. Later he clarified that posts were deleted by his page's moderator without his approval and that ACTA requires further discussion.

Published works
How Estonia is setting the bar for ‘smart defense (The Baltic Times, 2012)     
The Power of Freedom: Central and Eastern Europe after 1945 (Centre for European Studies, 2009)  
 
"Stalinism Was Just as Bad as Nazism" (The Wall Street Journal, 2008)
September 1944: Otto Tiefi valitsus (Varrak, 2007)  
Estonia's Way (Pegasus, 2006)  
Sinimäed 1944 (Tallinn, 2006)  
Lähiajalugu: gümnaasiumile (Avita, 2006)  
Estoński cud (Arwil, 2006)  
The Forgotten War (Grenader, 2005)  
Der vergessene Krieg (Grenader, 2005)  
Der rote Terror (Grenader, 2005)  
 (Grenader, 2005)  
Aizmirstais karš (Grenader, 2005)  
Unohdettu sota (Grenader, 2005)  
Eestlase raha läbi aegade (Eesti Ekspressi Kirjastus, 2006)  
 (Grenader, 2005)  
Estonia in World War II (Grenader, 2005)  
Viron lyhyt historia''' (Grenader, 2005)  Streifzug durch die estnische Geschichte (Grenader, 2005)  Äratajad (Tartu, 2005)   (Grenader, 2005)  Linnulennul Eesti ajaloost (Grenader, 2005)  Estonia: A Land of Human Dimensions (Uniprint AS, 2004)  Emajõgi 1944 (Tallinn, 2005)  Das estnische Wirtschaftwunder (Tallinn, 2002)  Estonia: Little Country that Could (London, 2002)  Eesti uus algus (Tallinn, 2002)  Vissza a jövőbe (Budapest, 2002)  Back to the future. 10 years of freedom in Central Europe (Tallinn, 2001) Észtország története (BDTF, 1999)  Estonoj tra tempoj (Eesti Esperanto Liit, 1998)  Eesti Vabadussõda ja Suurbritannia 1918–1920 (Tallinn, 1998)  (Avita, 1997)  Isamaa ilu hoieldes (Välis-Eesti & EMP, 1997) Teine Eesti: Eesti iseseisvuse taassünd 1986–1991 (Tallinn, 1996)  Punane terror (Välis-Eesti & EMP, 1996)  Raamat Jakob Hurdast (Tartu. 1995) Suurim armastus (Välis-Eesti & EMP, 1994) The Challenge for Europe (London, 1994)  Metsavennad (Tallinn, 1993)  Unohdettu sota (FinnEpos, 1993)  War in the Woods (Howells House, 1992)  14 juuni 1941.a: mälestusi ja dokumente (Tallinn, 1990) Kodu lugu'' (Tallinn, 1989)

References

External links

 Mart Laar's blog
 Laar's biography for the Friedman Prize
 Doing Business project

1960 births
Living people
People from Viljandi
Isamaa politicians
Prime Ministers of Estonia
Defence Ministers of Estonia
University of Tartu alumni
Members of the Riigikogu, 1992–1995
Members of the Riigikogu, 1995–1999
Members of the Riigikogu, 1999–2003
Members of the Riigikogu, 2003–2007
Members of the Riigikogu, 2007–2011
Members of the Riigikogu, 2011–2015
Recipients of the Order of the National Coat of Arms, 2nd Class
Commanders of the Order of Merit of the Republic of Poland
Recipients of St. George's Order of Victory
Leaders of political parties in Estonia
Grand Crosses 1st class of the Order of Merit of the Federal Republic of Germany
20th-century Estonian politicians
21st-century Estonian politicians
Voters of the Estonian restoration of Independence
Member of the Mont Pelerin Society